Bitis is a genus of venomous vipers found in Africa and the southern Arabian Peninsula. It includes the largest and the smallest vipers in the world. Members are known for their characteristic threat displays that involve inflating and deflating their bodies while hissing and puffing loudly. The type species for this genus is B. arietans, which is also the most widely distributed viper in Africa. Currently, 18 species are recognized.

Members of the genus are commonly known as African adders, African vipers, or puff adders.

Description

All have a wide, triangular head with a rounded snout, distinct from the neck, and covered in small, keeled, imbricated scales. The canthus is also distinct. A number of species have enlarged rostral or supraorbital scales that resemble horns. Their eyes are relatively small. They have large nostrils that are directed outwards and/or upwards. Up to six rows of small scales separate the rostral and nasal scales. All species have a well-developed supranasal sac. The fronts of the maxillary bones are very short, supporting only one pair of recurved fangs.

These snakes are moderately to extremely stout. Their bodies are covered with keeled scales that are imbricated (overlapping) with apical pits. At midbody, the dorsal scales number 21–46. Laterally, the dorsal scales may be slightly oblique. The ventral scales, which number 112–153, are large, rounded, and sometimes have slight lateral keels. Their tails are short. The anal scale is single. The paired subcaudal scales number 16-37 and are sometimes keeled laterally.

Geographic range
Puff adders are found in Africa and the southern Arabian Peninsula.

Behavior
Bitis species are known for their behavior of inflating and deflating their bodies in loud hissing or puffing threat displays. They are terrestrial ambush predators, and appear sluggish, but can strike with amazing speed. In contrast to the pitvipers of the subfamily Crotalinae, Bitis species appear to lack heat-sensitive organs and showed no differences in their behavior in laboratory tests towards warm and cool objects that mimicked prey.

Reproduction
All members are viviparous and some give birth to large numbers of offspring.

Venom
All members of this genus are dangerous – some extremely so. At least six different polyvalent antivenoms are available. Five are produced by Aventis Pasteur (France), Pasteur Merieux (France) and SAIMR (South Africa). All of these specifically protect against B. arietans and four also cover B. gabonica. At least one protects specifically against bites from B. nasicornis: India Antiserum Africa Polyvalent. In the past, such antivenoms have been used to treat bites from other Bitis species, but with mixed results.

Species

*) Not including the nominate subspecies.
T) Type species.

Taxonomy
Other species may be encountered in literature, such as:

 B. albanica – Hewitt, 1937
 B. armata – Smith, 1826

Lenk et al. (1999) used molecular data (immunological distances and mitochondrial DNA sequences) to estimate the phylogenetic relationships among species of Bitis. They identified four major monophyletic groups for which they created four subgenera:

 Bitis – B. arietans Calechidna – B. albanica, B. armata, B. atropos, B. caudalis, B. cornuta, B. heraldica, B. inorata, B. peringueyi, B. rubida, B. schneideri, B. xeropaga Macrocerastes – B. gabonica, B. nasicornis, B. parviocula Keniabitis – B. worthingtoniFor now, this division is of little consequence as far as the nomenclature is concerned. However, the definition of subgenera within a genus is often the sign of an impending split. Therefore, those interested in these snakes would do well to familiarize themselves with these new subgenera.

References

Further reading

 Duméril A-M-C, Bibron G. 1844. Erpetologie Générale ou Histoire Naturelle Complete des Reptiles. Vol.6. Paris: Librarie Encyclopédique de Roret. 609 pp. [60].
 Gray JE. 1842. Monographic Synopsis of the Vipers, or the Family Viperidæ. Zoological Miscellany, London 2: 68–71. [69].
 Laurenti J.N. 1768. Specimen medicum, exhibens synopsin reptilium emendatum cum experimentis circa venena et antidota reptilium Austriacorum. Vienna: J.T. de Trattern. 214 pp. [103].

 Merrem B. 1820. Versuch eines Systems der Amphibien. Tentamen systematis amphibiorum. Marburg: J.C. Krieger. xv + 191 pp. [150], 1 pl.
 Reuss T. 1939. "Berichtigungen und Ergänzungen zu meinen Arbeiten über Toxicophidier, 1938." Zeitschrift für Aquarien- und Terrarien-Vereine, Berlin (1), 13–14 [14].
 U.S. Navy. 1991. Poisonous Snakes of the World''. New York: Dover Books. (Reprint of US Govt. Printing Office, Washington D.C.) 232 pp. .

External links

 
 Southern adder (Bitis armata) at ARKive. Accessed 5 October 2006.

 
Snake genera
 
Taxa named by John Edward Gray